Matthew Olzmann is a poet, author, and essayist.

Personal life 
Matthew Olzmann was born in Detroit, Michigan. He currently teaches at Dartmouth College, and the MFA program at Warren Wilson College. Olzmann is married to poet Vievee Francis.

Career 
Olzmann received his BA from the University of Michigan-Dearborn and his MFA from Warren Wilson College.

He has had poems, stories, and essays appear in various publications, such as Best American Poetry, Kenyon Review, New England Review, Salt Hill, Margie, Atlanta Review, Necessary Fiction, Brevity, Southern Review, and elsewhere.

Olzmann is the author of three poetry publications. In 2012, Olzmann edited Another & Another: An Anthology from the Grind Daily Writing Series along with Ross White. His debut collection, Mezzanines, was published by Alice James Books in 2013, which won the Kundiman Prize. In November 2016, Olzmann published his second collection, Contradictions in the Design, also from Alice James Books. In January 2022, his third book of poems, Constellation Route, was published by Alice James Books.

He has received the Kresge Arts Foundation fellowship and a National Endowment for the Arts Fellowship.

Awards and fellowships 

 Kresge Arts Foundation Literary Arts Fellow (2010)
 Bread Loaf Writer's Conference Robert Frost Fellow in Poetry (2016)
 Kundiman Fellowship
 Kundiman Prize (2011)
 Kenyon Review Writer's Workshop
 The MacDowell Colony Poetry Fellowship (2018)
National Endowment of the Arts Fellowship (2021)

Works 

 Mezzanines (2013), Alice James Books
 Contradictions in the Design (2016), Alice James Books
Constellation Route (2022), Alice James Books

References 

21st-century American poets
21st-century American essayists
Writers from Detroit
University of Michigan–Dearborn alumni
Warren Wilson College alumni
Dartmouth College faculty
Warren Wilson College faculty
Year of birth missing (living people)
Living people